Alanna Nihell (born 14 October 1985) is a Northern Irish amateur boxer.

Nihell competed at the 2014 Commonwealth Games where she won a bronze medal in the women's lightweight event. She also competed in 2018.

She joined the army and served in the 27th regiment of the Royal Logistic Corps where she met her husband, Chez Nihell, who is a professional boxer.

References

External links

1985 births
Living people
Women boxers from Northern Ireland
Lightweight boxers
Women in the British Army
Royal Logistic Corps soldiers
Boxers from Belfast
Boxers at the 2014 Commonwealth Games
Boxers at the 2018 Commonwealth Games
Commonwealth Games bronze medallists for Northern Ireland
Commonwealth Games medallists in boxing
Medallists at the 2014 Commonwealth Games